Pre-B lymphocyte protein 3 is a protein that in humans is encoded by the VPREB3 gene.

The VPREB3 gene product is the human homologue of the mouse VpreB3 (8HS20) protein, and is specifically expressed in cell lines representative of all stages of B-lymphocyte differentiation.  It is also related to VPREB1 and other members of the immunoglobulin supergene family. The VPREB3 protein apparently associates with membrane mu heavy chains early in the course of pre-B cell receptor biosynthesis. The precise function of VPREB3 is not known, but it may contribute to mu chain transport in pre-B cells. In humans, besides the bone marrow and secondary lymphoid tissues such as the tonsils, the VPREB3 protein is also present in Purkinje cells of the cerebellum and in the zona glomerulosa of the adrenal.

References

Further reading